Wen Ning was a Chinese diplomat. He was Ambassador of the People's Republic of China to Albania (1979–1983).

Ambassadors of China to Albania
Possibly living people
Year of birth missing